Jaime Herbas (born 25 September 1941) is a Bolivian footballer. He played in five matches for the Bolivia national football team from 1963 to 1967. He was also part of Bolivia's squad that won the 1963 South American Championship.

References

External links
 

1941 births
Living people
Bolivian footballers
Bolivia international footballers
Place of birth missing (living people)
Association football midfielders
Club Aurora players
C.D. Jorge Wilstermann players